Chinese Taipei women's national softball team is the national team for Chinese Taipei.

History
The team competed at the 1986 ISF Women's World Championship in Auckland, New Zealand where they finished sixth. The team competed at the 1990 ISF Women's World Championship in Normal, Illinois where they finished with 6 wins and 3 losses. The team competed at the 1994 ISF Women's World Championship in St. John's, Newfoundland where they finished fifth. The team competed at the 1998 ISF Women's World Championship in Fujinomiya City, Japan where they finished seventh. The team competed at the 2002 ISF Women's World Championship in Saskatoon, Saskatchewan where they finished third. The team competed at the 2006 ISF Women's World Championship in Beijing, China where they finished eighth. The team competed at the 2010 ISF Women's World Championship in Caracas, Venezuela where they finished seventh. The team competed at the 2022 World Games and won a bronze medal.

References

External links 
 International Softball Federation

Women's national softball teams
Softball in Taiwan
Softball